Love, God, Murder is a Johnny Cash compilation box set (and 84th overall release) released in 2000. It features three themed CDs of songs Cash chose from his catalog.  Love features relationship songs, mostly written for June Carter Cash.  God is a collection of Gospel and spiritual songs.  Murder features another recurring topic of Cash's career, and perhaps his favorite subject, but one that he encouraged people "not to go out and do".  Each album was also released separately on the same day.  In 2004 Life, a fourth compilation was released.

Although the albums within the box set are compilations, they demonstrate Cash's lifelong affection for releasing concept albums.  Examples of previous Cash theme albums include Bitter Tears: Ballads of the American Indian (1964), Sings the Ballads of the True West (1965), America: A 200-Year Salute in Story and Song (1972) and The Rambler (1977).

Each of the three discs contains liner notes by a celebrity.  Love has liner notes by Cash's wife, June Carter Cash, U2's frontman Bono contributes liner notes for God, and Murder's liner notes are by film director Quentin Tarantino.

Love

Love credits
Johnny Cash – Arranger, Liner Notes, Adaptation, Compilation Producer
June Carter Cash – Liner Notes
John Jackson – Project Director
Steven Berkowitz – Producer
Chris Athens – Engineer
Mark Wilder – Engineer
Darcy Proper – Mastering
Howard Fritzson – Art Direction
Don Hunstein – Photography

God

Another feature of Cash's career is his affinity for another theme: gospel.  God pulls from a vast catalog of spiritual songs that includes the albums Hymns by Johnny Cash (1959), Songs of Our Soil (1959), Hymns from the Heart (1962), Sings Precious Memories (1975), Believe in Him (1986) and My Mother's Hymn Book (2004).

God credits
Johnny Cash – Arranger, Liner Notes, Adaptation, Compilation Producer
Bono – Liner Notes
John Jackson – Project Director
Steven Berkowitz – Producer
Chris Athens – Engineer
Mark Wilder – Engineer
Darcy Proper – Mastering
Howard Fritzson – Art Direction
Don Hunstein – Photography

Murder

Murder credits
Johnny Cash – Producer, Liner Notes, Compilation Producer
Quentin Tarantino – Liner Notes
John Jackson – Project Director
Steven Berkowitz – Producer
Chris Athens – Engineer
Mark Wilder – Engineer
Darcy Proper – Mastering
Mike Cimicata – Packaging Manager
Howard Fritzson – Art Direction
Don Hunstein – Photography
Patti Matheny – A&R
Tim Smith – A&R

Life

As a result of the success of the first three collections, in 2004, a fourth volume, Life, was released (his 90th overall release).  It mostly features songs about social and economic struggle.

Life credits
Johnny Cash – Producer, Compilation Producer, Selection
John Carter Cash – Executive Producer
Lou Robin – Executive Producer
Steven Berkowitz – Producer
Andy Manganello – Mixing
Joseph M. Palmaccio – Mastering
Geoffrey Rice – Mixing Assistant
Triana DOrazio – Packaging Manager
Howard Fritzson – Art Direction
David Gahr – Photography
Don Hunstein – Cover Photo

Charts
Album – Billboard (United States)

Concept albums
Concept album series
2000 compilation albums
Johnny Cash compilation albums
Legacy Recordings compilation albums
Columbia Records compilation albums